Binowo  is a village in the administrative district of Gmina Stare Czarnowo, within Gryfino County, West Pomeranian Voivodeship, in north-western Poland.

The village has a population of 270.

See also
History of Pomerania

References

Binowo